This is a list of broadcast television stations that are licensed in the U.S. state of Arkansas.

Full-power stations
VC refers to the station's virtual channel. RF refers to the station's physical RF channel.

Defunct full-power stations
Channel 9: KFOY-TV - NBC - Hot Springs (2/1/1961-4/17/1963)
Channel 17: KRTV - NBC/CBS/ABC/DuMont - Little Rock (4/5/1953-3/31/1954)
Channel 17: KLEP - ETV - Newark (11/12/1985-5/16/2005)
Channel 22: KFSA-TV (original) - NBC/CBS/ABC/DuMont - Fort Smith (7/9/1953-8/16/1958)
Channel 26: KRZB-TV - Ind. - Hot Springs (2/7/1986-3/30/1988)
Channel 36: KGTO-TV - NBC/CBS - Fayetteville (2/8/1969-12/23/1973)
Channel 43: KEJB - Ind./UPN/MNT - El Dorado (10/11/2003-6/4/2010)

LPTV stations

Translators

See also
 Arkansas media
 List of newspapers in Arkansas
 List of radio stations in Arkansas
 Media of cities in Arkansas: Fayetteville, Fort Smith, Hot Springs, Little Rock, Rogers

Bibliography

External links
 
  (Directory ceased in 2017)
 Arkansas Broadcasters Association
 
 
 
 
 

Arkansas

Television stations